Alectra is a genus of flowering plants in the family Orobanchaceae. It comprises hemiparasitic species which occur in tropical and southern Africa, including Madagascar, and tropical and subtropical Asia.

Systematics
The genera Alectra comprises the following species.
 Alectra alectroides (S.Moore) Melch.
 Alectra atrosanguinea (Hiern) Hemsl.
 Alectra aurantiaca Hemsl.
 Alectra avensis (Benth.) Merr.
 Alectra bainesii Hemsl.
 Alectra basserei Berhaut
 Alectra basutica (E.Phillips) Melch.
 Alectra capensis Thunb.
 Alectra dolichocalyx Philcox
 Alectra dunensis Hilliard & B.L.Burtt
 Alectra fruticosa Eb.Fisch.
 Alectra glandulosa Philcox
 Alectra gracilis S.Moore
 Alectra hildebrandtii Eb.Fisch.
 Alectra hirsuta Klotzsch
 Alectra humbertii Eb.Fisch.
 Alectra lancifolia Hemsl.
 Alectra linearis Hepper
 Alectra lurida Harv.
 Alectra natalensis (Hiern) Melch.
 Alectra orobanchoides Benth. syn. A. parvifolia (Engl.) Schinz
 Alectra parasitica A.Rich.
 Alectra picta (Hiern) Hemsl.
 Alectra pseudobarleriae (Dinter) Dinter
 Alectra pubescens Philcox
 Alectra pumila Benth.
 Alectra rigida (Hiern) Hemsl.
 Alectra schoenfelderi Dinter & Melch.
 Alectra sessiliflora (Vahl) Kuntze
 Alectra stolzii Engl.
 Alectra thyrsoidea Melch.
 Alectra virgata Hemsl.
 Alectra vogelii Benth.

Alectra pedicularioides Baker from Madagascar was moved to Pseudomelasma pedicularioides (Baker) Eb.Fisch. in 1996.

Notes

References

Orobanchaceae
Orobanchaceae genera